

Dinosaurs

Newly named dinosaurs

Paleontologists
 Birth of William Diller Matthew.

References

1850s in paleontology
Paleontology